Horst Nickel (born 4 March 1934) is a German former biathlete. He competed in the 20 km individual event at the 1960 Winter Olympics.

References

External links
 

1934 births
Living people
German male biathletes
Olympic biathletes of the United Team of Germany
Biathletes at the 1960 Winter Olympics
People from Schmalkalden-Meiningen
Sportspeople from Thuringia